Sergey Yakovlevich Nikitin (born 8 March 1944) is a prominent Soviet and Russian bard, composer, and biophysicist. He performs both solo and in a duet with his wife, Tatyana Nikitina all over Russia, the former Soviet republics, and other countries with significant Russian-speaking diaspora. Nikitin is also known as a composer and performer of songs for children.

Biography
Sergey Nikitin graduated from the Physics Department of Moscow State University in 1968. After completing postgraduate studies at the department of Biophysics at Moscow State University, he worked as a researcher in Zelinsky Institute of Organic Chemistry in Moscow (1971–1980). In 1980–1987 he was a researcher at the Institute of Biophysics in Pushchino and received a PhD in Physics in 1983.

Nikitin wrote music to his first song, En route (lyrics by Iosif Utkin), in 1962. In 1963, he founded an all-male quartet in the Department of Physics at Moscow State University, together with Sergey Smirnov, Boris Geller, Aleksei Monakhov, and later Vadim Khait.

From 1968 to 1977, he appeared at numerous concerts, together with other members of his quintet, including his wife, Tatyana Nikitina, Carmen Santacreu, Vladimir Ulin, and Nikolai Turkin. In 1987–1995, he was Musical Director at the Oleg Tabakov Studio-Theater in Moscow, and became a full-time singer and composer since 1995.

Family
Nikitin has an adult son, Alexander.

Awards
1980 The movie Moscow Does Not Believe in Tears for which Sergey Nikitin wrote the music received an Oscar in the 'best foreign film' category.
In 1997, Sergey Nikitin was awarded the title of the Meritorious Actor of Russia and, together with Tatiana Nikitina, became a laureate of the Tzarsko-Selsky Artistic Prize.

Works
CDs
 Records of 1971–1975, quintet of the Department of Physics in Moscow State University
 To the Music of Vivaldi ("Под музыку Вивальди"), 1994
 Sergei Nikitin (selected songs)], 1994
 A Big Secret for a Small Company ("Большой секрет для маленькой компании"), 1995
 Yesterday the Crocodile smiled, 1995
 [http://www.bard.ru/cgi-bin/disk.cgi?disk=674 Rubber hedgehog, songs for children on verses by Yunna Morits
 Brich-Mulla (Sergey Nikitin's songs on verses by Dmitry Sukharev cf. Brichmulla), 1996
 Sentries of Love ("Часовые любви", The Nikitins sing Bulat Okudzhava's songs)
 Field of miracles, 1998
 We don't choose times, 1998
 The Girl and the Plasticine, 1998
 Something is Happening to Me (Sergey Nikitin's songs to the verses of Yevgeny Yevtushenko), 1999
 Concert, 2000
 Retro for the Two of Us (Sergey Nikitin and Pyotr Todorovsky)
 Black and White Cinema, 2002
 Winter Holiday, 2002
Soundtracks to live-action films:
Almost a laughable story
Trips in an old car
Moscow Does Not Believe In Tears
Irony of Fate, –  a song from the film, lyrics by Boris Pasternak, music and performance by Nikitin, English subtitles by V. Chetin
Old New Year
Soundtracks to animated films:
A Big Secret for a Small Company (1979)
The Boy Was Walking, the Crow Was Flying (1981)
The Wolfskin (1982)
Music for the theater
 Mary Poppins, a collaboration with Viktor Berkovsky
Ali Baba and 40 songs of Persian Bazaar a collaboration with Viktor Berkovsky, libretto by Veniamin Smekhov
Opera Why are you wearing tails (based on a vaudeville by Anton Chekhov the Proposal)
and many others

References

External links
Full list of published songs by Nikitin with digital recordings (in Russian) 
Facebook account
VK account
Concert by Nikitin

1944 births
Living people
Moscow State University alumni
Russian bards
Russian composers
Russian male composers
Soviet physicists
Russian singer-songwriters
Seven-string guitarists
Russian male singer-songwriters
Soviet composers
Soviet male composers
Soviet musicians
Soviet male singer-songwriters
20th-century guitarists
20th-century Russian male singers
20th-century Russian singers